is The Brilliant Green's tenth single, released in 2000. It peaked at #8 on the Oricon singles chart.

Track listing

References

2000 singles
The Brilliant Green songs
Songs written by Tomoko Kawase
Songs written by Shunsaku Okuda
Sony Music Entertainment Japan singles
2000 songs